Choristoneura rosaceana, the oblique banded leaf roller or rosaceous leaf roller, is a moth of the family Tortricidae. It is native to North America, but has been accidentally introduced into other parts of the world.

The wingspan is 7.5–11 mm for males and 11.5–14 mm for females. Adults are on wing from June to July and again from August to September in most of its range.

Description
The caterpillar is green with a black head. The adult is a small, light brown moth.

Symptoms and signs
The presence of the species is suggested by rolled, tied and chewed leaves and minor feeding damage on fruits. Damage can be extensive on rosaceous plants.

Host plants

Recorded host plants are:
Acer
Aesculus
Betula
Cirsium
Crataegus
Corylus
Cornus
Cotoneaster
Dianthus (carnation)
Fragaria (strawberry)
Fraxinus
Lonicera
Malus
Picea
Pinus
Platanus
Populus
Prunus
Pyracantha
Quercus
Rhododendron (rhododendron, azalea)
Rosa
Rubus
Salix
Sorbus
Spirea
Syringa (lilac)
Tilia
Tsuga
Vaccinium
Verbena
Viburnum

References

Ontario Ministry of Agriculture, Food, and Rural Affairs

External links
Species info

Choristoneura